Alberto Cifuentes Martínez (born 29 May 1979) is a Spanish former professional footballer who played as a goalkeeper, currently the manager of Cádiz CF B.

Playing career
Born in Albacete, Castile-La Mancha, Cifuentes started playing as a senior with local Albacete Balompié's reserves. On 15 November 1998, after starter Julio Iglesias was sent off early into a home game against CP Mérida, he made his debut in Segunda División with the first team, going on to concede twice in a 0–2 home loss.

Cifuentes spent several years of his career in Segunda División B, representing in the second tier, other than Albacete, Ciudad de Murcia, UD Salamanca, Real Murcia and Cádiz CF for a total of 293 appearances. In the 2004–05 season he was part of RCD Mallorca's La Liga roster, being only third choice behind Miguel Ángel Moyá and Sander Westerveld.

Cifuentes moved abroad for the first time in summer 2014 at the age of 35, joining a host of compatriots – including manager Ángel Pérez García – at Polish club Piast Gliwice. He made his debut in top-flight football on 20 July of that year, starting in a 4–0 Ekstraklasa defeat at Lech Poznań.

In July 2015, Cifuentes returned to Spain after signing a contract with Cádiz CF. He played 42 matches in his debut campaign, which ended in promotion from division three.

Cifuentes rarely missed a game for the Andalusians the following seasons, notably winning the Ricardo Zamora Trophy for the category in 2017–18. He was again instrumental as they returned to the top flight in 2020 after 14 years, still under coach Álvaro Cervera.

On 20 September 2020, aged 41, Cifuentes made his Spanish top-tier debut by starting in a 2–0 away win against SD Huesca, becoming the oldest player to do so in the process. On 5 October, after 209 competitive games for Cádiz, he retired.

Coaching career
On 14 February 2021, after a spell as Cádiz sporting director, Cifuentes replaced Juan Manuel Pavón at the helm of their reserves.

Managerial statistics

References

External links

1979 births
Living people
Sportspeople from Albacete
Spanish footballers
Footballers from Castilla–La Mancha
Association football goalkeepers
La Liga players
Segunda División players
Segunda División B players
Atlético Albacete players
Albacete Balompié players
Atlético Dos Hermanas CF players
RCD Mallorca B players
RCD Mallorca players
Ciudad de Murcia footballers
Rayo Vallecano players
UD Salamanca players
Real Murcia players
Lorca FC players
Cádiz CF players
Ekstraklasa players
Piast Gliwice players
Spanish expatriate footballers
Expatriate footballers in Poland
Spanish expatriate sportspeople in Poland
Spanish football managers
Segunda División B managers
Segunda Federación managers
Cádiz CF B managers